Aleksei Sergeyevich Sergeyev (born 5 August 1979) is a former Russian professional football player.

Club career
He played 4 seasons in the Russian Football National League for FC Gazovik-Gazprom Izhevsk.

References

External links
 

1979 births
People from Chaykovsky, Perm Krai
Living people
Russian footballers
Association football defenders
FC Tyumen players
FC Gornyak Uchaly players
FC Bashinformsvyaz-Dynamo Ufa players
FC Orenburg players
FC Khimik Dzerzhinsk players
FC Nosta Novotroitsk players
Sportspeople from Perm Krai